Liu Xingang (刘心刚) (born 1962) is a Chinese film director. He also works as a graphic designer and art director, for which he received a Best Art Direction nomination in the 16th Golden Rooster Awards for The Sorrow of Brook Steppe.

Biography
Liu Xingang was born in 1962 and graduated from master course of Arts Central Academy of Drama. Because of his art background, he started his career as an art director. Five Star Hotel is his first work as a director.

Filmography

Films
A Sign (2000) as Production Designer
Da wan (2001) as Production Designer
Heavenly Grassland (2002) as Art Director
Shouji (2004) as Art Director
Last Hour (2008) as Art Department

TV Series
I'm Looking Forward to Being Loved (2004) as Director
The Wind Blows, The Skies Part (2004) as Director
Biography of Sun Tzu (2010) as Director

References
 
 

Chinese television directors
1962 births
Living people
Central Academy of Drama alumni